The Sun Dream 28 is a French sailboat that was designed by Tony Castro as a cruiser and first built in 1987.

The Sun Dream 28 is a development of the Arcadia 30 and was further developed into the Sun Way 28 in 1991.

Production
The design was built by Jeanneau in France, from 1987 until 1991, with 407 boats delivered.

Design
The Sun Dream 28 is a recreational keelboat, built predominantly of fiberglass, with wood trim. It has a masthead sloop rig, with a deck-stepped mast, a single set of swept spreaders and aluminum spars with 1X19 stainless steel wire rigging. The hull has a raked stem, a reverse transom, an internally mounted spade-type     rudder controlled by a tiller and a fixed fin keel or stub keel and retractable centerboard. The fin keel model displaces  and carries  of ballast, while the centerboard version displaces  and carries  of ballast.

The design's interior typically has sleeping accommodation for six people, with a double "V"-berth in the bow cabin, an "L"-shaped settee and a straight settee in the main cabin and an aft cabin with a double berth on the port side. The galley is located on the port side just forward of the companionway ladder. The galley is "L"-shaped and is equipped with a two-burner stove, an ice box and a sink. A navigation station is opposite the galley, on the starboard side. The head is located just aft of the navigation station on the starboard side.

Operational history
In a 1988 review in Cruising World described the design, "her interior arrangement also clouds the issue of her length overall. Designer Tony Castro has drawn in two double berths, one in the bow and the other aft to starboard. It opposes a fully private bath to port. The galley and chart table are both better-than-average size for a boat of this size and are positioned at the base of the companionway just aft of the settees and dining area. There's loads of light inside, mostly due to the effective, space-age ports that wrap around the coach roof. There are a variety of optional powerplants and, if so inclined, an owner can even specify a lifting keel."

See also
List of sailing boat types

References

External links

Keelboats
1980s sailboat type designs
Sailing yachts
Sailboat type designs by Tony Castro
Sailboat types built by Jeanneau